Hellbound Glory is an American country and roots rock band, featuring singer-songwriter Leroy Virgil. The band was originally formed in Reno, Nevada, United States, in 2008 by Virgil. Describing the band’s style as “Americana,” Virgil credits his influences as “Hank Williams, Nirvana, and Hank Williams Jr.”

According to The Oklahoma Gazette (February 26, 2014), "Hellbound Glory has three studio albums, and Virgil is at work on new material."

Hellbound Glory is signed to The Agency Group LTD for worldwide booking representation.

Formation and history
The band was formed in the early 2000s after founding member, Leroy Virgil, relocated to Reno, Nevada. Originally from the town of Aberdeen, Washington where he played in the band Soylint Green; Virgil found inspiration for the band and material in his adopted new home, "It’s influenced by the Reno nightlife, experiences I’ve had, women I’ve met, fights I’ve gotten into—the local bar scene in general."

Touring and appearances
Hellbound Glory tours consistently in North America. In 2012 the band was tapped to perform as a featured artist on the Kid Rock Chillin’ the Most Cruise  and again supported Kid Rock in 2013 on the Rebel Soul Tour (28 dates) along with Buckcherry; The first leg of which was publicly announced on November 27, 2012.

2013 included two dates in support of Kid Rock and ZZ Top as part of the headliner's "Best Night Ever" package at DTE Energy Music Theatre in Clarkston, Michigan.

2014 tour dates included east coast support with Leon Russell.

Hellbound Glory supported active rock band 10 Years in March 2014 in support of the headliner's acoustic tour.

In the media
LA Weekly Music Editor, Nicholas Pell, listed Hellbound Glory #2 in his list of "10 Country Artists You Should Be Listening To"] feature; describing the band's music in part as, "Think of them as evoking the energy of the wildest party Waylon, Willie and Bocephus ever had."

Washington Post Music Editor, Chris Richards, featured Hellbound Glory's "LV" as a part of the newspaper's "This Month's Best Music" column describing the release; "The “country” that country singers so often pine for can be a sanctuary, a playground, a paradise. But for Leroy Virgil of Hellbound Glory, it’s a twilight zone where his cell phone won’t work. “No service, so nervous,” he sings sheepishly on his confident new EP. “Nothin’ on the radio."

Hellbound Glory songs receive consistent airplay on Outlaw Country (Sirius XM) Channel.

“Livin’ This Way,” from the album Scumbag Country, was featured in the major motion picture “Bad Grandpa” starring Johnny Knoxville released in October 2013.

In March 2013, Hellbound Glory, performed as a featured artist for CMT Edge Live in Nashville, TN.

In February 2013, Hellbound Glory performed exclusively at Elvis Presley's Graceland on break from the Kid Rock Rebel Soul Tour.

Discography

Pure Scum (2020)
Produced by Shooter Jennings and recorded in L.A.'s Echo Park neighborhood, it features eight new songs from Leroy with a couple rearrangements of traditionals.

Track list:
 "Ragged but Alright"
 "Wild Orchid"
 "Someone to Use"
 "Loose Slots"
 "Dial 911"
 "Neon Leon"
 "Renowhere"
 "Damned Angel"
 "Hank Williams Lifestyle"
 "DUIORDIE"

Pinball (2017)
Hellbound Glory's first release for Shooter Jennings's Black Country Rock label, and their first album in six years. Released in November 2017. It was re-released on Record Store Day 2018. The new release included "(Livin' That Way) You Better Hope You Die Young," recorded as a duet with Tanya Tucker.

Track list:
 "'Merica (The Good Ole U.S.A.)"
 "That's Just What I Am"
 "Six Strings Away"
 "Vandalism Spree"
 "Sun Valley Blues #3 (Bloodweiser)"
 "Empty Bottles"
 "Pinball"
 "Delta Dawn"
 "Hellbound Blues"
 "Another Bender Might Break Me"
 "Blue Yodel Number 5 (California Blues)"

LV (2014)
"Describing the new music, Virgil stated, "It’s a little more stripped-down and acoustic just because that’s what I wanted to do with this song. I would say it’s a little bit deeper than some of my old stuff."  The EP was recorded entirely at Oceanside Recording Studio in Aberdeen, WA. "LV" was officially released May 13, 2014.

Track list:
"Streets of Aberdeen"
"Just A Shell"
"So Nervous, No Service"
"Small Township"
"Goodnight, Irene"

Damaged Goods (2011)
Damaged Goods has been described as an album whose characters "are people that are easy to relate to. Like many of us, they are trying their best to make the most of their lives, but despite their efforts they seem destined to fail,"  "Damaged Goods" was originally released in 2011.

Track list: 
"Bastard Child" 
"White Wolf" 
"You Better Hope You Die Young" 
"Til The lights go out"
"Lost Cause"
"Knocked Off the Horse"
"She Left Me in Modesto"
"Gonna be a Goner"
"Barroom Beauty"
"Livin' with the Shades Pulled Down"

Old Highs New Lows (2010)
Described as "drug-addled party of a record that succeeds by marrying boozy roadhouse charm with an unusually high standard of songcraft,"  “Old Highs & New Lows” was originally released in 2010.

Track list: 
Another Bender Might Break Me" 
"Gettin' High and Hittin' New Lows" 
"Be My Crutch" 
"One Way Track Marks" 
"Hank Williams Records" 
"Either Way We’re Fucked" 
"Why Take The Pain" 
"Hard Livin' Man" 
"Slow Suicide" 
"In The Gutter Again" 
"Too Broke To Overdose" 
"I'm Leavin' Now (Long Gone Daddy)"

Scumbag Country (2008)
Described as displaying "clever lyrics, irresistible energy, and a sound that pays tribute to country music’s past while still managing to sound modern,"  "Scumbag Country" was originally released in 2008.

Track list: 
"Hellbound Glory"
"Livin' This Way"
"Hello Five O"
"Chico's Train"
"The Ballad of Scumbag Country"
"Drive in Harm's Lane"
"I'll Be Your Rock (At Rock Bottom)"
"Get Your Shit and Go"
"Mickey Meth (Downtown)"
"Can't Say I'll Change"
"Waylon Never Done it Their Way"

References

External links
Official website
Hellbound Glory CMT Artist Page

Musical groups from Nevada
American country music groups
Roots rock music groups
Musical groups established in 2008